The Internet Junkbuster is a web proxy that can block ads and cookies. It was developed by the Junkbusters Corporation and released under the GNU General Public License. However, the Internet Junkbuster has not been updated since 1998 and the junkbusters.com web site is no longer maintained.

Privoxy is an up-to-date filtering proxy based on the Junkbuster code, but it is much more powerful. See also the Proxomitron, a Windows-based web filter. Update dated November 2012: "Sorry, the Junkbusters.com web site is no longer maintained", says the website.

Credit 
The article contains material from InfoAnarchy

External links
Official website
Galactica Proxy - proxy that shows the state of your Web surfing in realtime (based on Junkbuster, created in 2001)

Internet Protocol based network software
Privacy software